Wolica  is a village in the administrative district of Gmina Brześć Kujawski, within Włocławek County, Kuyavian-Pomeranian Voivodeship, in north-central Poland.

References

External links
Wolica listed on Gmina Brześć Kujawski official website

Wolica